Benkato "Kato" Ottio (20 March 1994 – 9 January 2018) was a Papua New Guinean rugby league footballer.

Early life
Ottio was born and raised in the village of Tatana, near Port Moresby, Papua New Guinea.

Before playing rugby league, Ottio played volleyball and was a member of PNG's squad at the 2013 Pacific Mini Games in Wallis and Futuna, which won gold, and Amoa NCD's team at the 2014 Asian Men's Club Volleyball Championship in the Philippines. Ottio then took up rugby league exclusively, playing at an amateur level for the Dobo Warriors.

Playing career

Early career
In October 2014, Ottio played for the PNG Prime Minister's XIII against the Australian Prime Minister's XIII, which saw him subsequently sign with the Papua New Guinea Hunters of the Queensland Cup, starting in 2015. Ottio made his debut for the national side in May 2015 against Fiji. In February 2016, Ottio signed a two-year contract with the Canberra Raiders, spending the duration with the Raiders' feeder team, the Mount Pritchard Mounties, in the New South Wales Cup. He was named on the wing in the 2016 NSW Cup Team of the Year, having scored 29 tries in 23 games, the New South Wales Rugby League's leading tryscorer in 2016. Ottio was not considered for PNG's May 2017 match against the Cook Islands as he had recently returned from a long-term injury. In October 2017, Ottio was named in PNG's squad for the 2017 World Cup.

Widnes Vikings
In December 2017, Ottio signed with the Widnes Vikings who play in the Super League.

International caps
Ottio won six caps for the national side, known as the Kumuls. His debut was in May 2015 against Fiji at the Robina Stadium, Gold Coast. A second cap, also against Fiji came a year later and Ottio scored his debut international try at the Parramatta Stadium in Sydney. Selected for the Kumuls squad for the 2017 World Cup, he played in all three of the team's group games played in Port Moresby and scored a try in the game against Wales. His final international match was the quarter-final defeat by England at the Melbourne Rectangular Stadium.

Death
Ottio collapsed due to heat stroke while training alongside the Papua New Guinea Hunters on 7 January 2018, and died in the early hours of 9 January suffering from internal bleeding. He had been due to travel to the United Kingdom to join the Widnes Vikings squad for pre-season training on 11 January. Ottio's funeral was held on 12 January at Sir John Guise Indoor Complex, and was attended by the Prime Minister of Papua New Guinea, Peter O'Neill.

References

External links

 Canberra Raiders profile 
 2017 RLWC profile

1994 births
2018 deaths
Deaths from hyperthermia
Mount Pritchard Mounties players
Papua New Guinea Hunters players
Papua New Guinea national rugby league team players
Papua New Guinean rugby league players
People from the National Capital District (Papua New Guinea)
Rugby league centres
Rugby league second-rows
Deaths from bleeding
Sport deaths in Oceania